Tewodros I, throne name Walda Anbasa (Ge'ez: ወልደ ዐንበሳ; died 2 July 1414) was Emperor of Ethiopia from 1413 to 1414, and 
a member of the Solomonic dynasty. He was the son of Dawit I by Queen Seyon Mangasha.

Reign
Despite the fact it only lasted nine months (from 12 October 1413 to 23 June 1414), Tewodros's reign acquired a connotation of being a golden age for Ethiopia. The explorer James Bruce later commented,

 

E. A. Wallis Budge repeats the account of the Synaxarium that Emperor Tewodros was "a very religious man, and a great lover of religious literature". Budge adds that Tewodros wished to make a pilgrimage to Jerusalem, but was convinced not to make the journey by the Abuna Mark, "who feared for his safety." Despite this, Budge notes that he annulled the agreement of his ancestor Yekuno Amlak that granted a third of the country to the Ethiopian Church.

Tewodros died beyond the Awash river. Taddesse Tamrat suspects that chroniclers of this era tried to suppress the violent death of the Emperors. Tewodros supposedly fell in battle against the Walashma princes. He was first buried at the church of Tadbaba Maryam, but his descendant Emperor Baeda Maryam I had his body re-interred at Atronsa Maryam.

References

Solomonic dynasty
Emperors of Ethiopia
1414 deaths
15th-century monarchs in Africa
15th-century Ethiopian people
Year of birth unknown